William Pike Hall Sr. (October 19, 1896 – December 16, 1945) was an American politician. He served as a Democratic member of the Louisiana State Senate.

Life and career 
Hall was born in Mansfield, Louisiana, the son of Ida Jack and W. P. Hall, a judge. He attended Centenary College of Louisiana, Sewanee: The University of the South, Tulane University and Columbia Law School. He was an attorney.

In 1924, Hall was elected to the Louisiana State Senate, serving until 1932, when he was succeeded by Cecil Morgan.

Hall died in December 1945, at the age of 49.

References 

1896 births
1945 deaths
People from Mansfield, Louisiana
Democratic Party Louisiana state senators
20th-century American politicians
Centenary College of Louisiana alumni
Sewanee: The University of the South alumni
Tulane University alumni
Columbia Law School alumni
Louisiana city attorneys